Holly Rene Holm (born October 17, 1981) is an American mixed martial artist, who competes in the Ultimate Fighting Championship. She is the former UFC Women's Bantamweight Champion, and a former professional boxer. She was a multiple-time world champion in boxing, defending her titles 18 times in three weight classes, and a two-time Ring magazine fighter of the year (2005, 2006). She is ranked by BoxRec as the best female professional boxer of all time. She is the only fighter to have won a boxing world title and a UFC title.

Holm's most notable win in mixed martial arts (MMA) occurred at UFC 193 on November 15, 2015, in Melbourne, when she captured the bantamweight title and gave Ronda Rousey her first loss in the sport. According to ESPN, this fight is generally considered to be one of the biggest upsets in combat-sports history.  As of May 23, 2022, she is ranked #3 in the UFC women's bantamweight rankings, and as of March 7, 2023, she is #15 in the UFC women's pound-for-pound rankings.

Early life
Holm was born in Albuquerque, New Mexico, the youngest of three children. Her father, Roger, is a Church of Christ preacher—as a fighter, Holly would later be nicknamed "The Preacher's Daughter"—and her mother, Tammy, is a massage therapist. Holm is of primarily Irish descent.

Growing up, Holm played soccer and participated in gymnastics, swimming and diving. Her parents divorced shortly before she graduated from Manzano High School in 2000; after graduation, she studied for a year at the University of New Mexico.

Amateur kickboxing career
Holm's path to a career in boxing and kickboxing began with aerobics classes when she was 16 years old. Her cardio-kickboxing instructor, Mike Winkeljohn, recognized Holm's potential as a fighter and began training her.

In September 2001, Holm won the championship title in the International Rules Adult Women's Welterweight Division at the International Kickboxing Federation (IKF) USA National Amateur Championship Tournament, held in Kansas City, Missouri. She fought two bouts in the tournament. She won the first by technical knockout at 34 seconds in the first round. She won the second by unanimous decision. This was Holm's last amateur competition. Her overall amateur kickboxing record is 6–0–2.

Professional boxing career
Holm has held several welterweight boxing titles, been highly regarded as one of the best female welterweights in the world, and is considered among the best of all time, by some. She also has been named Ring Magazine female Fighter of the Year, twice in consecutive years in 2005 and 2006. She is a big draw in her hometown of Albuquerque, having all but three of her fights there and just one of her fights outside of her home state of New Mexico.

In June 2008 she became the undisputed welterweight champion and holder of belts from 140 to 154 by defeating former champ Mary Jo Sanders by decision. They had a rematch on October 17, 2008, at the Palace of Auburn Hills in suburban Detroit, which ended in a draw.

On December 2, 2011, Holm took on knockout artist Anne Sophie Mathis of France for the vacant IBA female and WBAN welterweight titles. Holm was badly beaten by the stronger Mathis without the referee interfering, even going into the canvas without a count. She finally lost by knockout in the 7th round, which would be dubbed the upset of the year in women's boxing. The two fought again on June 15, 2012, for Mathis's WBF female, IBA female, and WBAN welterweight titles. Holm took a unanimous decision to win over Mathis, becoming the new champion and avenging her earlier KO loss.

Mixed martial arts career

Early career
Holm made her mixed martial arts debut on March 4, 2011, against Christina Domke at an event organized by her boxing promoter, Lenny Fresquez. She headlined the card with Jackson's Submission Fighting teammate Keith Jardine. Holm won the fight via TKO in the second round after her opponent was unable to continue due to leg kicks inflicted by Holm.

Holm returned to MMA on September 9, 2011, at Fresquez Productions: Clash in the Cage against Strikeforce veteran Jan Finney. She defeated Finney by TKO in the third round.

Bellator MMA
On February 28, 2013, Holm made her Bellator MMA debut against Katie Merrill at Bellator 91 in Rio Rancho, New Mexico. Holm won the bout via TKO in the second round.

Holm announced that she would retire from boxing after her May 11, 2013, boxing match against Mary McGee so that she can fully concentrate on her MMA career. The message came as a punctuation in the negotiations to arrange a title-battle between Holm and the Norwegian champion Cecilia Brækhus. Holm went on to defeat McGee via unanimous decision, for her boxing retirement bout.

Legacy Fighting Championship
On July 19, 2013, Holm faced Allanna Jones at Legacy Fighting Championship 21. She won the fight by head-kick knockout in the second round.

Holm was expected to face Erica Paes at Legacy Fighting Championship 24 on October 11, 2013. However, Paes was removed from the card and Holm instead faced Nikki Knudsen. Holm won the fight via TKO due to a body kick and knees in round two.

On December 6, 2013, Holm faced Angela Hayes at Fresquez Productions: Havoc. She won the fight via unanimous decision.

On April 4, 2014, Holm faced Juliana Werner for the inaugural Legacy FC Women's Bantamweight Championship. She won the bout and title via TKO in the fifth round due to a head kick and punches. Holm broke her left arm during the first round of the bout.

Ultimate Fighting Championship
On July 10, 2014, the media announced that Holm had signed a multi-fight deal with the Ultimate Fighting Championship (UFC). Later in an interview with MMA Junkie, Holm's manager Lenny Fresquez disclosed that Holm's contract is for five fights.

Holm was expected to make her debut at UFC 181 against Raquel Pennington. However, on November 13, Holm was forced to pull out due to an undisclosed injury.  The two fighters faced each other at UFC 184. Holm won the bout by split decision (29–28, 28–29, and 30–27).

Holm faced Marion Reneau on July 15, 2015, at UFC Fight Night 71. Holm won the fight by unanimous decision (30–27, 30–26, and 29–28).

Women's bantamweight championship

Holm vs. Rousey
In her highest-profile MMA fight to date, Holm faced defending women's bantamweight champion Ronda Rousey before a record-setting crowd in the main event of UFC 193 on November 14, 2015. Despite being a massive betting underdog, Holm controlled a majority of the bout with her striking and defended all of Rousey's takedowns. The second fighter to take Rousey past the first round (after Miesha Tate), she won the fight via knockout in the second with a high kick, ending Rousey's undefeated streak and three-year reign as champion, causing her to spend the night in the hospital.

Holm was also awarded her first "Fight of the Night" and "Performance of the Night" bonus awards (totalling $100,000). By winning the title, she became the first person to win championships in both boxing and MMA. Following the bout, UFC fighter Jon Jones said he thought Holm was "already the G.O.A.T. (greatest of all time) of women's combat sports". Her hometown, Albuquerque, New Mexico, proclaimed November "Holly Holm Month".

In her first title defense, Holm lost to Miesha Tate in the fifth round on March 5, 2016, at UFC 196. After four rounds of back-and-forth fighting, Tate defeated Holm in the fifth with a rear-naked choke. Holm was strong in the first round of the fight standing up but was less effective grappling with Tate on the mat. After Tate took Holm down in the second round, Holm almost submitted to a guillotine choke but wriggled out just before the bell. In the fifth round, Tate scored another takedown and locked in another rear-naked choke. Holm refused to submit, was rendered unconscious, and the referee declared a technical submission.

Holm faced Valentina Shevchenko on July 23, 2016, at UFC on Fox 20. She lost the bout via unanimous decision.

Women's featherweight championship
Holm faced Germaine de Randamie at UFC 208 for the inaugural women's featherweight championship on February 11, 2017. She lost the fight via unanimous decision. At the end of the second and third rounds, de Randamie continued to throw punches after the horn had sounded and the referee stepped in, the first of which was a right hand that visibly wobbled Holm, who had already stopped fighting. The referee did not take a point on either occasion. 14 out of 23 media outlets and a majority of MMA fans still scored the fight in favor of Holm. Holm said post-fight that she believed both instances were intentional. She appealed to the New York State Athletic Commission (NYSAC) to review the referee's decisions and determine an "appropriate result." On February 28, the NYSAC denied the appeal, finding "no clear error or violation of statute or rule."

Post championship 
Holm returned to bantamweight division after losing the featherweight title bout. Holm faced Bethe Correia at UFC Fight Night: Holm vs. Correia on June 17, 2017, in Singapore. She won the fight via knockout in the third round via a head kick that dropped Correia and then a punch. The win earned Holm her second Performance of the Night bonus award. This also set up her bout against UFC Women's Featherweight Champion Cris Cyborg at UFC 219

In a return to the women's featherweight division, Holm challenged Cris Cyborg for the UFC Featherweight Championship on December 30, 2017, in the main event at UFC 219. She lost the fight via unanimous decision. This fight earned Holm her second Fight of the Night bonus.

Holm faced Megan Anderson on June 9, 2018, at UFC 225. She won the fight via unanimous decision.

Holm was expected to face Aspen Ladd in a bantamweight bout on March 2, 2019, at UFC 235. However, on January 31, 2019, it was reported the pairing was no longer taking place at the event.

On March 20, it was reported that Holm signed a new six-fight contract with the UFC.

Holm faced Amanda Nunes for the Women's bantamweight championship on July 6, 2019, at UFC 239. She lost the fight via technical knockout in round one after being dropped by a head kick and finished with follow-up punches by Nunes.

Holm was scheduled to face Raquel Pennington on October 6, 2019, at UFC 243. However, on September 27, it was revealed that Holm withdrew from the bout due to a hamstring injury and the bout was cancelled. The pair was rescheduled to fight on January 18, 2020, at UFC 246. She won the fight via unanimous decision.

Holm was scheduled to face Irene Aldana on August 1, 2020, at UFC Fight Night: Brunson vs. Shahbazyan, but Aldana withdrew after testing positive for COVID-19. Holm was removed from the card as well and the pairing was rescheduled for October 4, 2020 at UFC on ESPN: Holm vs. Aldana. Holm won the fight by a unanimous decision.

Holm was scheduled to face Julianna Peña on May 8, 2021, at UFC on ESPN 24.  However, Holm was forced to withdraw from the bout, citing hydronephrosis.

Holm was scheduled to face Norma Dumont in a featherweight bout on October 16, 2021, at UFC Fight Night 195. However, Holm withdrew from the bout due to a knee injury, and she was replaced by Aspen Ladd.

Holm faced Ketlen Vieira on May 21, 2022, at UFC Fight Night 206. She lost the fight via controversial split decision. 18 out of 20 media outlets scored the bout as a win for Holm.

Holm is scheduled to face Yana Kunitskaya on March 25, 2023, at UFC on ESPN 43.

Fighting style
Holm employs frequent lateral movement while working stiff jabs to an opponent's head. When standing within the pocket, she often waits to attack with counter-strikes, usually employing a straight left hand. Holm is also known for her punching combinations, typically done while her opponents are against the cage.

Decorated boxer and ONE Championship fighter Ana Julaton has described Holm as a "natural mover", noting her footwork as an asset in setting up strikes. At UFC 193, Ronda Rousey took several blows while struggling to close the distance against Holm. Holm uses a variety of kicking techniques, often targeting the body with a fast side kick, pushing back a rush with a low oblique kick, and attacking the head with a left high kick.

In popular culture
Holm is one of several boxers photographed by artist Delilah Montoya and profiled in the publication Women Boxers: The New Warriors. She appeared in the 2016 feature film Fight Valley alongside Miesha Tate and Cris Cyborg.

Championships and accomplishments

Boxing
 Overall
 16 title defenses won at three different weight classes
 World Boxing Federation
 WBF Female World Light Welterweight Championship (One time)
 WBF Female World Welterweight Championship (One time)
 2012 Female Fighter of the Year
 2012 Female Fight of the Year vs. Anne Sophie Mathis on June 15
 Women Boxing Archive Network
 WBAN World Welterweight Championship (One time)
 WBAN World Junior Welterweight Championship (One time)
 WBAN World Junior Middleweight Championship (One time; First)
 2012 Biggest Comeback of the Year
 2011 Fight of the Year vs. Anne Sophie Mathis on December 2
 2010 Fighter of the Year
 2009 Most Accomplished of the Year
 2008 Highest Achievements of the Year
 2007 Fighter of the Year
 2007 Most Improved Boxer of the Year
 2006 Most Improved Boxer of the Year
 2005 Hottest Rising Star of the Year
 2005 Upset of the Year vs. Christy Martin on September 16
 World Boxing Council
 WBC Female World Welterweight Championship (One time)
 NABF Female Light Welterweight Championship (One time)
 Global Boxing Union
 Global Boxing Union (GBU) World Welterweight Championship (One time)
 Women's International Boxing Association
 WIBA World Light Welterweight Championship (One time)
 WIBA World Welterweight Championship (One time)
 International Female Boxers Association
 IFBA World Welterweight Championship (One time)
 IFBA World Light Middleweight Championship (One time)
 2006 Fighter of the Year
 World Boxing Association
 WBA Female World Welterweight Championship (One time; First)
 International Boxing Association
 IBA Female World Welterweight Championship (Three times)
 IBA Female World Light Welterweight Championship (Three times; First)
 BadLeftHook.com
 2012 Female Comeback Fighter of the Year
 BoxRec
 Highest ranked female boxer in automated all-time pound-for-pound rankings at the time of her retirement from boxing. By the time of winning her UFC championship she dropped to #2 in pound-for-pound rankings but still was #1 in welterweight
 The Ring
 2006 Female Fighter of the Year
 2005 Female Fighter of the Year
 New Mexico Boxing
 2013 Hall of Fame Inductee
 2010 Fighter of the Year
 2009 Fighter of the Year
 2008 Fighter of the Year
 2007 Fighter of the Year
 2006 Fighter of the Year
 2005 Fighter of the Year
 Albuquerque Sports Hall of Fame
 2005 Female Athlete of the Year
International Women's Boxing Hall of Fame
2017 Hall of Fame inductee
New Mexico Sports Hall of Fame
2019 Hall of Fame inductee
International Boxing Hall of Fame
2022 Hall of Fame inductee

Kickboxing
 International Kickboxing Federation
 IKF/Ringside 2001 USA National Amateur International Rules Welterweight Championship
 IKF/Ringside 2001 Central Mountain Regional Amateur International Rules Welterweight Tournament Winner

Mixed martial arts
 Ultimate Fighting Championship
 UFC Women's Bantamweight Championship (One time)
 Fight of the Night (Two times) vs. Ronda Rousey and Cris Cyborg
 Performance of the Night (Two times)  vs. Ronda Rousey and Bethe Correia
 2015 Upset of the Year vs. Ronda Rousey
 2015 Knockout of the Year vs. Ronda Rousey
 2015 Newcomer of the Year
 Legacy Fighting Championships
 Legacy FC Women's Bantamweight Championship (One time; first)
 ESPN
 2015 Knockout of the Year vs. Ronda Rousey on November 15
 Sherdog
 2015 Upset of the Year vs. Ronda Rousey on November 15
 2015 Breakthrough Fighter of the Year
 2015 All-Violence Third Team
 MMAFighting.com
 2015 Knockout of the Year vs. Ronda Rousey on November 15
 MMAJunkie.com
 2015 Upset of the Year vs. Ronda Rousey
 2015 Knockout of the Year vs. Ronda Rousey
 2015 November Knockout of the Month vs. Ronda Rousey
 Bleacher Report
 2015 Biggest Moment: Holly Holm Knocks out Ronda Rousey on November 15
 2015 Knockout of the Year vs. Ronda Rousey on November 15
 2013 WMMA Knockout of the Year vs. Allanna Jones on July 19
 Inside MMA
 2015 Female Fighter of the Year Bazzie Award
 2015 Knockout of the Year Bazzie Award vs. Ronda Rousey on November 15
 2013 Rising Star of the Year Bazzie Award
 World MMA Awards
 2015 Female Fighter of the Year
 2015 Breakthrough Fighter of the Year
 2015 Knockout of the Year vs. Ronda Rousey at UFC 193
 2015 Upset of the Year vs. Ronda Rousey at UFC 193
 ESPY Awards (2016)
 Upset of the Year vs. Ronda Rousey on November 15, 2015

Mixed martial arts record

|-
|Loss
|align=center|14–6
|Ketlen Vieira
|Decision (split)
|UFC Fight Night: Holm vs. Vieira
|
|align=center|5
|align=center|5:00
|Las Vegas, Nevada, United States
|
|-
|Win
|align=center|14–5
|Irene Aldana
|Decision (unanimous)
|UFC on ESPN: Holm vs. Aldana
|
|align=center|5
|align=center|5:00
|Abu Dhabi, United Arab Emirates
|
|-
|Win
|align=center|13–5
|Raquel Pennington
|Decision (unanimous)
|UFC 246
|
|align=center|3
|align=center|5:00
|Las Vegas, Nevada, United States
|
|-
|Loss
|align=center|12–5
|Amanda Nunes
|TKO (head kick and punches)
|UFC 239
|
|align=center|1
|align=center|4:10
|Las Vegas, Nevada, United States
|
|-
|Win
|align=center|12–4
|Megan Anderson
|Decision (unanimous)
|UFC 225
|
|align=center|3
|align=center|5:00
|Chicago, Illinois, United States
|
|-
|Loss
|align=center|11–4
|Cris Cyborg
|Decision (unanimous)
|UFC 219
|
|align=center|5
|align=center|5:00
|Las Vegas, Nevada, United States
|
|-
|Win
|align=center|11–3
|Bethe Correia
|KO (head kick and punch)
|UFC Fight Night: Holm vs. Correia
|
|align=center|3
|align=center|1:09
|Kallang, Singapore
|
|-
|Loss
|align=center|10–3
|Germaine de Randamie
|Decision (unanimous)
|UFC 208
|
|align=center|5
|align=center|5:00
|Brooklyn, New York, United States
|
|-
|Loss
|align=center|10–2
|Valentina Shevchenko
|Decision (unanimous)
|UFC on Fox: Holm vs. Shevchenko
|
|align=center|5
|align=center|5:00
|Chicago, Illinois, United States
|
|-
|Loss
|align=center|10–1
|Miesha Tate
|Technical Submission (rear-naked choke)
|UFC 196
|
|align=center|5
|align=center|3:30
|Las Vegas, Nevada, United States
|
|-
|Win
|align=center|10–0
|Ronda Rousey
|KO (head kick and punches)
|UFC 193
|
|align=center|2
|align=center|0:59
|Melbourne, Australia
|
|-
|Win
|align=center|9–0
|Marion Reneau
|Decision (unanimous)
|UFC Fight Night: Mir vs. Duffee
|
|align=center|3
|align=center|5:00
|San Diego, California, United States
|
|-
|Win
|align=center|8–0
| Raquel Pennington
|Decision (split)
| UFC 184
| 
|align=center|3
|align=center|5:00
|Los Angeles, California, United States
|
|-
|Win
|align=center|7–0
|Juliana Werner
|KO (head kick and punches)
|Legacy FC 30: Holm vs. Werner
|
|align=center|5
|align=center|1:50
|Albuquerque, New Mexico, United States
|
|-
|Win
|align=center|6–0
|Angela Hayes
|Decision (unanimous)
|Fresquez Productions: Havoc
|
|align=center|3
|align=center|5:00
|Albuquerque, New Mexico, United States
|
|-
|Win
|align=center|5–0
|Nikki Knudsen
|TKO (body kick and knees)
|Legacy FC 24: Feist vs. Ferreira
|
|align=center|2
|align=center|1:18
|Dallas, Texas, United States
|
|-
|Win
|align=center|4–0
|Allanna Jones
|KO (head kick)
|Legacy FC 21: Huerta vs. Hobar
|
|align=center|2
|align=center|2:22
|Houston, Texas, United States
|
|-
|Win
|align=center|3–0
|Katie Merrill
|TKO (punches)
|Bellator 91
|
|align=center|2
|align=center|3:02
|Rio Rancho, New Mexico, United States
|
|-
|Win
|align=center|2–0
|Jan Finney
|TKO (body kick)
|Fresquez Productions: Clash in the Cage
|
|align=center|3
|align=center|2:49
|Albuquerque, New Mexico, United States
|
|-
|Win
|align=center|1–0
|Christina Domke
|TKO (leg kicks)
|Fresquez Productions: Double Threat
|
|align=center|2
|align=center|3:58
|Albuquerque, New Mexico, United States
|

Professional boxing record

Kickboxing record (incomplete)
{{Kickboxing record start|title=Kickboxing Record|record= 2 wins (2 knockouts, 0 decisions), 1 Loss (1 knockout, 0 decisions), 0 Draws}}
|- style="background:#cfc;"
|
| Win
|style="text-align:left" | Alisa Cantwell
|Ring of Fire 9: Eruption
|style="text-align:left" | Baraboo, Wisconsin
| TKO
| 1
| 1:30
| 2–1
|- style="background:#fbb;"
|
| Loss
|style="text-align:left" | Trisha Hill
|GKD Productions & Ring of Fire: Triple Threat Fight Night
|style="text-align:left" | Albuquerque, New Mexico
| KO
| 4
| N/A
| 1–1
|- style="background:#cfc;"
|
| Win
|style="text-align:left" | Valerie Anthonson
|World Championship Kickboxing: Bad to the Bone
|style="text-align:left" | Bernalillo, New Mexico
| TKO
| 2
| N/A
| 1–0
|-
| colspan=9 | Legend''''':

Pay-per-view bouts

MMA

Filmography

Television

Film

Personal life 
Holm has close relationships with her parents and brothers. Her father always attends her fights, and for years assisted in her corner during her boxing matches. She and her father are partners in a real estate company and sold Jon Jones his home. Holm is a Christian and her faith background is in Churches of Christ. Her mother, Tammy Bredy, has seen little of Holm in the cage and rarely attends Holm's bouts.

In 2012, she married Jeff Kirkpatrick, also from Albuquerque, whom she met in college. In the beginning of 2020, it was revealed that the couple had separated in July 2019. Holm filed for a divorce and sought to get her maiden name back.

See also 
 List of current UFC fighters
 List of female mixed martial artists

References

External links

 
 Holly Holm at Awakening Fighters
 Holly Holm at Legacy Fighting Championship
 
 
 
 

1981 births
Living people
American female mixed martial artists
Bantamweight mixed martial artists
Featherweight mixed martial artists
Mixed martial artists utilizing boxing
Mixed martial artists utilizing kickboxing
Mixed martial artists utilizing Brazilian jiu-jitsu
Mixed martial artists from New Mexico
Ultimate Fighting Championship female fighters
Ultimate Fighting Championship champions
American women boxers
Light-welterweight boxers
Welterweight boxers
Light-middleweight boxers
Boxers from New Mexico
World Boxing Association champions
World Boxing Council champions
American female kickboxers
Welterweight kickboxers
Kickboxers from New Mexico
American practitioners of Brazilian jiu-jitsu
Female Brazilian jiu-jitsu practitioners
Sportspeople from Albuquerque, New Mexico
American members of the Churches of Christ
American people of Swedish descent
American people of Irish descent
American people of German descent
21st-century American women